Garu-Tempane District is a former district that was located in Upper East Region, Ghana. Originally it was formerly part of the then-larger Bawku East District in August 2004. However, on 15 March 2018, it was split out into two new districts: Garu District (capital: Garu) and Tempane District (capital: Tempane). The district assembly was located in the eastern part of Upper East Region and had Garu as its capital town.

Sources

References

Districts of Upper East Region